Alés Harun born as Aljaksandr Uladzimiravič Prušynski (11 March 1887 in Minsk – 28 July 1920 in Kraków) was a Belarusian poet, prose writer, dramatist, lyricist and an opinion journalist.

He was born on February 27 (March 11) 1887 in Minsk. His father, Uladzimir Prušynski, a manual labourer and mother, Sophia (née. Zhivitsa), were members of the Catholic community in Minsk. At five years old he could read in Russian and Polish. Later he graduated from the Minsk third city parish school (1897) and a trade school (1902). He worked as a joiner in the carpentry and furniture factory in Minsk. From 1904 he joined the Belarusian Party of Socialist Revolutionaries. In 1907 he began to publish in the newspaper "Nasha Niva". On March 4, 1907, he was arrested for anti-government activities at the underground press on Broad Street in Minsk, where was printed at the time an appeal "to all workers". In July 1908 the Vilnius Court of Justice condemned him to lifelong exile in Siberia. He was exiled to Irkutsk Province. From 1914 he received the right to travel throughout Siberia. While working on a barge on the Lena River, he prepared a collection of his poems, Matshyn Dar (A Mother's Gift), and sent it to Vilnius where it was later published in 1918. In 1917 he returned to Minsk and participated in the first All-Belarusian Congress and Belarusian National Committee but he became disillusioned and as a member of the Belarusian Military Commission he collaborated with the Polish army of Jozef Pilsudski in hopes of Belarusian independence.

Further reading

In Belarusian
 Выбраныя творы / Алесь Гарун; [Уклад., прадм., каментар У. Казберука]. — Мн.: Беларускі кнігазбор, 2003. — 445 с. — (Беларускі кнігазбор. Серыя 1. Мастацкая літаратура). — .
 І я з народам …: вершы, апавяданні, п'еса: [для сярэдняга і старэйшага школьнага ўзросту] / Алесь Гарун; [уклад. і прадм. У. Казберука]. — Мн.: Мастацкая літаратура, 2007. — 140, [1] с. — (Бібліятэка школьніка). — 
 Мае каляды / А. Сумны. — Вільня: Выдавецтва У. Знамяроўскага, 1920. — 15 с.
 Матчын дар: Думы і песні 1907—1914 / Пад рэд. акад. І. І. Замоціна. — Мн.: Выд. Беларус. Акад. навук, 1929. — 158(2)с. — (Акадэмічная бібліятэка беларускіх пісьменнікаў. Кн. 3).
 Матчын дар і іншыя творы = Mutters Gabe und andere Werke = Mother's gift and other writings / Алесь Гарун; пад рэд. А. Адамовіча і Ст. Станкевіча; Беларускі інстытут навукі і мастацтва. — Нью Ёрк — Мюнхэн: Выд-ва «Бацькаўшчына», 1962. — 270 с., [1] л. партр.
 Матчын дар: Вершы, апавяданні, п'есы / А.Гарун; Уклад. і аўт. прадм. У. Казбярук. Запіскі Самсона Самасуя: Раман, апавяданні: Для ст. шк. узросту / А.Мрый; Аўт. прадм. і ўклад. Я. Р. Лецка; Да зб.у цэлым: Маст. Г. В. Шапялевіч. — Мн.: Юнацтва, 1995. — 475 с. — (Школьная библиотека). — 
 Матчын дар: Думы і песні, 1907―1914 гг. / Алесь Гарун. — Мн.: Маст. літ., 1988. — 125, [2] с. — 
Сэрцам пачуты звон: Паэзія, проза, драматургія, публіцыстыка / Уклад., прадм. і камент. У.Казберука; Маст. У.Басалыга. — Мн. : Маст. літ., 1990. — 358, [1] с., 5 л. партр.: іл. — (Спадчына).

References 
 * "Writer Ales Harun" Retrieved 2017-02-16.

1887 births
1920 deaths
Writers from Minsk
People from Minsky Uyezd
Belarusian male poets
20th-century Belarusian poets
Journalists from Minsk
Belarusian dramatists and playwrights
20th-century male writers
20th-century journalists